Juwal a.k.a. Muniwara is a Torricelli language of Papua New Guinea. Other names are Mambe and Tumara ~ Tumaru. It is spoken in Mambe and Tumeru villages of Turubu Rural LLG, East Sepik Province.

References

Marienberg languages
Languages of East Sepik Province